WUMB-FM (91.9 FM) in Boston, Massachusetts, is the radio station of the University of Massachusetts Boston. It broadcasts an Americana/Blues/Roots/Folk mix hosted by its staff weekdays. On weekends the station concentrates on traditional folk, Celtic, blues, and world music including syndicated programs.  Overnight programming starting at midnight and usually through 5am is a repeat of a portion of the previous day's programming; an announcement of this fact is made at midnight. The station has received many awards for its folk music programming.

Programming

WUMB-FM operates as a noncommercial public radio–style station which carries some NPR programming. HD Radio technology allows WUMB to transmit a high-quality digital signal. 
Due to the crowded state of the noncommercial end of the FM dial in New England, WUMB operates at a modest 160 watts, effectively limiting its coverage area to Boston itself and its innermost suburbs.  To widen its signal, it operates a network of eight repeater stations across eastern Massachusetts and southern New Hampshire. WUMB-FM can also be heard on the Internet at both low bit rate for those with dial up connection and in stereo for those with broadband service.

Since 1998, WUMB has sponsored a live music festival, called the Boston Folk Festival through 2009, but renamed to WUMB Music Fest in 2010 and 2011.  The first festival was held at scattered sites in Boston's Back Bay.  Since then, it has taken place on the University of Massachusetts-Boston campus.   The event is currently in hiatus, however WUMB does continue to participate in music festivals around New England like the Lowell Summer Music Series and the New Bedford Folk Festival.

Until 2013, WUMB broadcast with 660 watts, with a height above average terrain of 63 meters; after the station lost its then–transmitter site, the station moved to a new site and began broadcasting with its present 160-watt facility.

Original materials from WUMB have been contributed to the American Archive of Public Broadcasting.

Repeater stations
In addition to the main station, WUMB is relayed by eight repeaters to widen its broadcast area.

Notes:

In addition to its primary repeaters, starting in 2007 WPNI (1430 AM) in Amherst temporarily repeated WUMB by arrangement with WFCR while Pamal Broadcasting sought a buyer for the station; this ended when Pamal shut WPNI down on November 30, 2013. WHRB (95.3 FM) in Cambridge and WLYN (1360 AM) in Lynn have also offered temporary WUMB simulcasts in the past during transitions to either new studios or new ownership.

References

External links
 
 Artist - Song now playing
 WUMB-FM records, 1969-2012, University Archives and Special Collections, Joseph P. Healey Library, University of Massachusetts Boston

UMB-FM
Radio stations established in 1982
NPR member stations
1982 establishments in Massachusetts
University of Massachusetts Boston